C. Raman was an Indian civil servant and administrator. He was the administrator of Mahe from  22 August 1960 to 21 October 1960.

References 

 

Year of birth missing
Possibly living people
Administrators of Mahe